Max Ray Boydston (January 22, 1932 – December 12, 1998) was a professional gridiron football end who played in the National Football League (NFL), the Canadian Football League (CFL), and the American Football League (AFL).

College career
Born in Ardmore, Oklahoma, Boydston played college football for Bud Wilkinson's Oklahoma Sooners where he was an All-American in 1954. He was one of several Sooners from Muskogee, Oklahoma High School - along with the Burris brothers (Buddy, Kurt and Bob) and Bo Bolinger - to earn All-Conference or All-American honors in the 1950s.

Professional career
Boydston was a first-round selection (second overall) in the 1955 NFL Draft by the Chicago Cardinals. He played for the Cardinals from 1955 to 1958.  In 1959, he played in the CFL for the Hamilton Tiger-Cats.  In the AFL he played for the Dallas Texans (1960–1961) and the Oakland Raiders (1962).

Coaching career
Boydston coached at Carroll Senior High School in Southlake, Texas in 1964–65 and 1965–66.

External links

 

1932 births
1998 deaths
American football ends
Canadian football ends
American players of Canadian football
Chicago Cardinals players
Dallas Texans (AFL) players
Hamilton Tiger-Cats players
Oakland Raiders players
Oklahoma Sooners football players
High school football coaches in Texas
All-American college football players
People from Ardmore, Oklahoma
Players of American football from Oklahoma
American Football League players